Motown Live is an American television series showcasing live performances by music artists in the areas of rhythm & blues, hip hop, and popular music. The show had 13 episodes from 1998-1999.

The show was hosted by Robert Townsend and Montell Jordan. The format featured several Motown Live Dancers opening and closing the show, and backup artists. The show included some comedy sketches between artist appearances.

Ricky Minor (current music director for American Idol) was music and house band director.

Motown Live Dancers included Lisa Joann Thompson, Faune Chambers, Carmit Bachar, and Kevin Stea.

The show was in syndication until 2000 and was distributed by Universal Worldwide Television.

Cast 
 Donielle Artese, Motown Live Dancer
 Carmit Bachar, Motown Live Dancer
 Joe Blount
 Faune Chambers, Motown Live Dancer
 Montell Jordan
 Kevin Stea, Motown Live Dancer
 Lisa Joann Thompson, Motown Live Dancer
 Robert Townsend

References 

1990s American music television series
1990s American variety television series
1998 American television series debuts
1999 American television series endings
Fox Broadcasting Company original programming
Television series by Universal Television